Love Is on the Move is the third studio album by Christian band Leeland. It was released on August 25, 2009, and debuted at number 5 on the Billboard Christian Albums chart.

The single "New Creation" is inspired by the verse in 2 Corinthians 5 v 17, which says "Therefore, if anyone is in Christ, he is a new creation."

Track listing

References

2009 albums
Leeland (band) albums
Reunion Records albums